Wrony may refer to the following places in Poland:
Wrony, Lower Silesian Voivodeship (south-west Poland)
Wrony, Łódź Voivodeship (central Poland)
Wrony, Lubusz Voivodeship (west Poland)
Wrony, Warmian-Masurian Voivodeship (north Poland)

See also
 Crows (film), a 1994 Polish film